Klinkenberg is a hamlet in the Dutch province of Gelderland. It is a part of the municipality of Buren, and lies about 8 km southwest of Veenendaal.

It was first mentioned in 1845 as Klinkenberg. Both clinge and berg mean hill. The postal authorities have placed it under Ingen.

References
 

Populated places in Gelderland
Buren